Dendrophilia (or less often arborphilia or dendrophily) literally means "love of trees". The term may sometimes refer to a paraphilia in which people are sexually attracted to or sexually aroused by trees. This may involve sexual contact or veneration as phallic symbols or both.

The word dendrophilia has also been used in cognitive science. Fitch’s dendrophilia hypothesis deals with trees in terms of cognitive representation, stating that the human brain partakes in abstraction by forming tree structures with data. Andrew Marvell made poetry using dendrophilic themes.

References

Paraphilias